Plön is a district in Schleswig-Holstein, Germany. It is bounded by (from the east and clockwise) the districts of Ostholstein and Segeberg, the city of Neumünster, the district of Rendsburg-Eckernförde, the city of Kiel and the Baltic Sea.

History 
The district was established by the Prussian administration in 1867. In 1932 it was enlarged with parts of the dissolved district of Bordesholm. During the 20th century some municipalities left the district due to incorporation into the city of Kiel.

Geography 
The inland part of this small district is covered with lakes. The Großer Plöner See ("Great Plön Lake", 29 km2) and the Selenter See ("Lake Selent", 22 km2) are the largest lakes in Schleswig-Holstein. The lakeland and the adjoining parts of the neighbouring district Ostholstein constitute the region called Holstein Switzerland, since the countryside is very hilly. However, the highest hill (Bungsberg) is only 168 m high. North of the lakeland there is the Probstei, a region on the coast of the Baltic Sea.

Coat of arms

Towns and municipalities

Map of municipalities and Ämter

References

External links 

  (German)

 
Districts of Schleswig-Holstein